"Go!" is the debut single of American pop duo Jupiter Rising, taken from their first and second albums Jupiter Rising and Electropop. The song received notability when it was played on the Disney Channel Original Movie Jump In! and charted on the Hot Dance Airplay charting for 12 weeks, and 12 weeks on Billboard's Hot Dance Music/Club Airplay.

Track listing
From Billboard
Track
Go! [Pop Mix]    3:27
Go! [Rhythm Mix]    3:23

Charts

References

Jupiter Rising songs
2006 songs